Mirosław Tadeusz Rzepkowski (born 19 June 1959) is a Polish sport shooter. He was born in Wrocław. He won a silver medal in skeet at the 1996 Summer Olympics in Atlanta.

Olympic results

References

1959 births
Living people
Sportspeople from Wrocław
Polish male sport shooters
Olympic shooters of Poland
Olympic silver medalists for Poland
Olympic medalists in shooting
Shooters at the 1996 Summer Olympics
Medalists at the 1996 Summer Olympics
20th-century Polish people